Alan Baumgarten (born February 1, 1957) is an American film editor. He frequently collaborates with directors Jay Roach and Ruben Fleischer having edited four of their feature films. He has been nominated twice for the Academy Award for Best Film Editing, for American Hustle (2013), together with co-editors Jay Cassidy and Crispin Struthers, and The Trial of the Chicago 7 (2020).

Filmography

Television
 Eerie, Indiana (1991)

References

External links

American film editors
Living people
Film people from Los Angeles
1957 births
Primetime Emmy Award winners